St. Joseph Island Airport  is located on St. Joseph Island, Ontario, Canada.

References

Registered aerodromes in Algoma District
St. Joseph Island (Ontario)